"Consolation" is a song written by Swedish keyboardist Benny Andersson, first recorded as the Hep Stars thirteenth single in October 1966. The single largely left the baroque pop style sound which had dominated both their previous singles "Sunny Girl" and "Wedding", but continues the soft rock style of "I Natt Jag Drömde" and also ventures into the territory of psychedelic rock, a genre that would become prevalent the following year.

The single continued the Hep Stars chart success in Sweden, reaching number 2 on Tio i Topp. On Kvällstoppen, the song peaked at number 1 for ten unconsecutive weeks, and as a result became the Hep Stars biggest hit on that chart. Andersson would later state dismay with the single. It was included on their second studio album The Hep Stars.

Background 
By October, the Hep Stars had released three singles in 1966, two of which were original compositions. These were "Sunny Girl" and "Wedding", both of which reached number 1 on Tio i Topp and Kvällstoppen. These two singles brought them great critical acclaim by critics as well, and were a radical departure from their previously raunchy, rhythm and blues influenced sound which had dominated most of their 1965 output. The Hep Stars also founded Hep House in June of that year. Hep House was an organization comparable to the Beatles Apple Corps which they had founded two years later. Hep House had the responsibility of handling the band's business ventures, as well as publishing songs written by Benny Andersson and the other band members.

In September 1966, the Hep Stars released their twelfth single, "I Natt Jag Drömde". This was the first Hep Stars single in the Swedish language, reaching number 2 on Kvällstoppen. And due to this it divided the Hep Stars, along with their fans to a certain extent because of its softer approach. Due to it reaching number 1 on Svensktoppen, it brought the Hep Stars an entire new generation of fans, predominantly older people. It was due to this that they tasked Benny Andersson to write a new song, to compete with "I Natt Jag Drömde" on the charts. Andersson wrote "Consolation", which also became their first song to be published by Hep House. "Consolation", along with its B-Side were recorded in October 1966 at Europafilm Studios in Stockholm. The intro of the song largely revolves around Andersson's Vox Continental organ.

Release 
Shortly after recording, the Hep Stars quickly wanted the single out on the Swedish market. So in the same month, Olga Records released "Consolation" as a single in October 1966 with the catalogue number of SO 33. The B-Side of the single was the 1958 Elvis Presley song "Don't", which was recorded largely due to being a huge inspiration for lead singer Svenne Hedlund. "Don't" was the third B-side which was originally recorded by Elvis Presley, the other two being "Young and Beautiful" which was issued as the B-Side of "So Mystifying" and "When My Blue Moon Turns to Gold Again" which was released as the B-side of "Wedding". Initial Swedish-made copies of "Consolation" erroneously states Andersson's name as "Benny Andesson". Following the single's huge demand, it was re-printed in January 1967 and as a result, the mistake was fixed. This mistake does not appear on internationally made copies.

"Consolation" debuted at number 1 on Kvällstoppen on 8 November 1966, becoming their first single to do so. The single stayed on top of the chart for 9 weeks, after which, on 10 January 1967, it went down to number 2, being replaced by "Alex Is The Man" by Ola & the Janglers. On 17 January, it went back to number 1, completing a run of 10 weeks on top of the chart. Following this, it descended down the chart, appearing at number 6 on 24 January. The following week, it had climbed down to number 8. The single was last seen on the chart on 7 February at a position of number 11, after which it went off the chart. In total, it spent 14 weeks on the chart, 13 of which were in the top-10 and 11 of which were in the top-5, of which 10 were at the top of the chart. It topped the chart longer than any other Hep Stars single released. On Tio i Topp, it also fared well, being voted to number 2 on 28 October 1966, staying on the chart for five weeks. It, however, failed to compete with "I Natt Jag Drömde", which spent a staggering 29 weeks on the chart, of which 16 were in the top-5 and 9 were at number 2.

The single would later be included on the Hep Stars second studio album, The Hep Stars along with "Wedding". Nonetheless, Andersson would later state dismay with the single. It has been compared to the Doors "Light My Fire" which was released the following year, and is one of their most well-known recordings.

Personnel 

 Svenne Hedlund – lead vocals
 Janne Frisk – guitar, backing vocals
 Lennart Hegland – bass guitar
 Christer Pettersson – drums, backing vocals
 Benny Andersson – Vox Continental organ, piano

Charts

References

External links
 The Hep Stars on Discogs
 The Hep Stars website

1966 songs
Hep Stars songs
1966 singles
Number-one singles in Sweden